Operation Iron Mountain was a security operation during the Vietnam War in Quảng Ngãi Province, that took place from 28 February 1969 to 28 February 1971.

Background
The 11th Light Infantry Brigade was tasked with conducting search and clear operations in the area of operations in southeastern Quảng Ngãi Province to destroy People's Army of Vietnam (PAVN) and Vietcong (VC) bases and forces, interdict PAVN/VC supply routes from the Central Highlands to the populated coastal areas and maintain liaison with Army of the Republic of Vietnam (ARVN) Ranger camps in the highlands.

Operation

1969
The troops, supported by helicopter gunships and airstrikes killed 3 PAVN for the loss of 4 US killed. The force was engaged with rocket and machine gun fire and the bodies of 26 PAVN/VC soldiers were observed lying in the strike area.

The attack was repulsed and 23 PAVN/VC killed for no US losses. The troops attacked supported by tanks and armored personnel carriers until the PAVN/VC broke contact at 16:00 leaving 18 dead and 1 crew-served weapon. US casualties were 7 killed.

Elements of the division's armored cavalry squadron (in tanks and armored personnel carriers) joined the fight while additional support came from helicopter gunships and artil1ery fire. At 16:00 the PAVN/VC withdrew, leaving 6 dead and 1 crew-served and 2 individual weapons, US casualties were 2 killed. The troopers defended their position and were supported by a USAF AC-47 Spooky gunship. At 00:30 the PAVN/VC withdrew, leaving 11 dead, and two individual and three crew-served weapons. In an exchange of heavy small arms and automatic weapons fire, the troopers attacked. At 17:45 the PAVN/VC withdrew. A sweep of the area by elements of the Brigade and the ARVN 4th Regiment, 2nd Division found 61 PAVN/VC dead and 9 individual weapons and 4 crew-served weapons. US losses were 3 killed. The troopers defended and directed artillery fire onto the firing positions. In a sweep made later, 14 dead PAVN/VC soldiers were found, and one crew-served and three individual weapons captured. US casualties were 1 killed. The PAVN/VC withdrew leaving 16 dead and 5 individual weapons, US losses were 1 killed.

At 13:30, another element of the brigade enforced the action, and additional support came from U.S. artillery and helicopter gunships. At 19:30, the PAVN/VC withdrew, leaving 11 dead, along with 2 crew-served and 4 individual weapons. US casualties were 4 killed.

The infantrymen fired back and the PAVN/VC withdrew, leaving 2 dead and an individual weapon, 2 US soldiers were killed. The troopers fired back with unit weapons, including tank guns and the heavy machineguns. At 15:15 the PAVN/VC withdrew, leaving 9 dead, US losses were 1 killed. Sporadic fighting continued throughout the day as the troopers fought back with unit weapons and were supported by helicopter gunships. The PAVN/VC withdrew leaving 8 dead, 8 individual weapons and 4 crew-served weapons. US losses were 5 dead.

A later search of the area found a further 14 PAVN/VC bodies. Fighting continued until 19:30 when the PAVN/VC withdrew, leaving 22 dead and 9 individual and 2 crew-served weapons, US losses were 4 killed. The troopers fired back with unit weapons, and were supported by helicopter gunships and a USAF AC-119 gunship. US casualties were 11 killed.

1970
The defenders returned fire and were supported by helicopter gunships and artillery. At 03:50 on 3 January the PAVN/VC withdrew leaving 29 dead and 9 individual weapons on the perimeter, US losses were 7 killed. The defenders returned fire and at about 02:00 the PAVN/VC withdrew, leaving 7 dead, 3 individual weapons and one RPG launcher.

Contact continued until 14:40 when the remaining enemy
withdrew, 5 PAVN/VC were killed and 7 suspects detained. At 20:30 a forward observer sighted an unknown size PAVN/VC force moving in an area 11 miles west of Quảng Ngai. Artillery fire was directed onto the enemy location and the bodies of 21 PAVN/VC soldiers were observed lying in the area. On 19 February at 11:00 helicopter crewmen sighted 5 PAVN/VC soldiers 7 miles north of Đức Phổ, they were engaged and all 5 were killed and 3 weapons captured.

The unit returned fire and were supported by helicopter gunships and a USAF AC-ll9 gunship. At 22:45 the PAVN/VC withdrew, US losses were 1 killed.

The bodies of the 10 soldiers were observed in the area after the strikes.

In the first week of November the Brigade reported 8 PAVN/VC killed. On 8 November Company D, 4th Battalion, 3rd Infantry Regiment found 11 graves of PAVN/VC killed by artillery. On 10 November in a series of minor engagements 10 PAVN/VC were reported killed. On 22 November Company C, 4/3rd had three mechanical ambushes detonate which resulted in a total of 10 VC killed and the capture of assorted clothing, equipment and documents. Later the same day Recon Company, 3rd Battalion, 1st Infantry Regiment, while searching bunkers detonated an 82mm mortar round resulting in 4 US killed.

There were light and scattered contacts reported by the Brigade from 7-10 December. On 11 December, Company C, 4/3rd uncovered a weapons cache containing 3 81mm mortars, 11 individual weapons and 2 PRC-10 radios. Company A, 3/1st found another cache containing 5 weapons. On 16 December elements of Troop F, 8th Cavalry Regiment engaged 5 VC which resulted in 5 VC killing all 5. Activity was light throughout the area of operations and was characterized by small scattered contacts until 24 December 1970 when Recon Company, 4th Battalion 21st Infantry Regiment, came under sniper fire losing 2 killed. At 18:00 on 24 December, Division units assumed a defensive role for the twenty-four hour Christmas Truce period and resumed offensive operations at 18:00 on 25 December. On 26 December a mechanical ambush set by Company C, 4/21st was triggered killing 3 VC. From 18:00 on 31 December until 18:00 on 1 January 1971 Division units observed the New Years truce period.

1971
On 4 January Company C, 1st Battalion, 20th Infantry Regiment, engaged 2 VC killing 1 and capturing 2 weapons. On 5 January Recon Company, 1/20th supported by aviation and artillery killed 7 PAVN and captured 1 weapon. On 8 January Company C, 4/21st detonated 2 105mm artillery rounds resulting in 2 killed. On 10 January in the late afternoon Recon Company, 1/20th killed 5 PAVN. On 12 January 174th Aviation Company gunships killed 4 PAVN and captured 4 individual weapons. On 14 January Company A, 4/3rd found 5 weapons. On 14 January Company D, 4/3rd found 5 weapons and Company C, 4/3rd engaged 4 VC killing 3. On 16 January Troop B, 123rd Aviation Company in two contacts killed 13 VC. The same day a USAF air strike killed 5 VC. On 17 January a vehicle from 723rd Maintenance Company was ambushed resulting in 2 US killed. On 23 January, Troop B 123rd Aviation Company engaged 8 VC killing all of them. On 25 January Troop B, 123rd Aviation in 3 contacts killed 20 PAVN/VC. That same day Company A, 4/21st triggered a mechanical ambush killing 5 PAVN/VC and an air strike killed a further 5 PAVN. For the period from 21 to 31 January the Brigade reported 65 PAVN/VC killed and 6 weapons captured.

On 3 February Troop B, 123rd Aviation killed 12 VC and captured 2 weapons and 2 suspects. On 19 February Troop B, 123rd Aviation engaged 7 PAVN/VC killing all of them. While on a search and clear mission on 21 February Company B, 1/20th detonated a booby trap resulting in 2 US killed. On 22 February Troop D, 1/1st Cavalry killed 13 PAVN/VC. On 28 February Troop D, 1/1st Cavalry and Company B, 1/29th engaged 6 PAVN/VC killing 5 of them.

Aftermath
The operation concluded on 28 February 1971. US losses were 440 killed, PAVN/VC losses were 4589 killed and 137 captured.

References

1969 in Vietnam
1970 in Vietnam
1971 in Vietnam
Iron Mountain
Battles and operations of the Vietnam War in 1969
Battles and operations of the Vietnam War in 1970
Battles and operations of the Vietnam War in 1971
History of Quảng Ngãi province